Named after Atoka County, Oklahoma, the Atoka Formation is a geologic formation in central and western Arkansas, eastern Oklahoma, central and western Texas, and eastern New Mexico. It is the surface rock of the Boston Mountains and dominates exposures in the Frontal Ouachita Mountains of the Arkansas River Valley.

Sedimentology
The Atoka Formation is a sequence of marine sandstones, siltstones, and shales, and may be as thick at 25,000 feet in the Ouachita Mountains. The formation is conformable with the Bloyd Shale in the Boston Mountains and the Johns Valley Formation in the Ouachita Mountains.

Paleofauna

Trace Fossils
 Conostichus
 C. arkansanus

References

Carboniferous Arkansas
Carboniferous geology of Oklahoma
Carboniferous southern paleotropical deposits